FC Iskra Engels is a Russian football team from Engels. It played professionally in 1967–1969, 1993 and 1996–2005. Their best result was 5th place in the Zone Povolzhye of the Russian Second Division in 1999.

Team name history
 1967–1968: FC Trud Engels
 1969: FC Avtomobilist Engels
 1992–1994: FC Zavolzhye Engels
 1995–2005: FC Iskra Engels

External links
  Team history at KLISF

Association football clubs established in 1967
Football clubs in Russia
Sport in Saratov Oblast
1967 establishments in Russia